Conference of the Birds: The Story of Peter Brook in Africa is a biographical book by John Heilpern, in which he describes a journey by theatre director Peter Brook and a group of actors, including Helen Mirren, across the Sahara in Northwest Africa.

The journey was part of Brook's attempt to develop a form of theatre which did not depend on the cultural assumptions of the audience.

The company tested some forms of theatre they had devised at the Centre International de Recherche Théâtrale, by performing them for peoples with whom the actors shared neither common language nor culture. One of the pieces they performed was La Conférence des oiseaux, Brook's stage adaptation of the 12th-century Persian poem The Conference of the Birds by Attar of Nishapur.

1977 non-fiction books
Biographies about writers
British biographies
Non-fiction books about theatre
Sociology books
Faber and Faber books